Chaudhry Saeed Iqbal (30 October 1966 – 12 December 2022) was a Pakistani politician who had been a member of the National Assembly of Pakistan from 2008 to 2013.

Political career
Iqbal was elected to the National Assembly of Pakistan from Constituency NA-81 (Faisalabad-VII) as a candidate of Pakistan People's Party (PPP) in 2008 Pakistani general election. He received 65,322 votes and defeated Nisar Ahmad Jutt.

Iqbal ran for the seat of the National Assembly from Constituency NA-81 (Faisalabad-VII) as a candidate of PPP in 2013 Pakistani general election, but was unsuccessful. He received 40,199 votes and lost the seat to Nisar Ahmad Jutt.

Personal life and death
Iqbal died from cardiac arrest in Faisalabad on 12 December 2022, at the age of 56.

References

1966 births
2022 deaths
Pakistan People's Party politicians
Pakistani MNAs 2008–2013
Politicians from Faisalabad